Wiley City is an unincorporated community in Yakima County, Washington, United States, located near the southwest city limits of Yakima.

History
In 1871, Hugh Wiley settled in the area now known as Wiley City. The town was founded in 1910 on part of the property of James J. Wiley, son of Hugh Wiley.

The Yakima Valley Transportation Company (YVT) built a railroad line connecting the town with Yakima in 1910.  YVT provided both electric interurban service and freight service to Wiley City, but passenger service was discontinued in 1935.  Freight service continued until 1985, when the YVT itself was abandoned, and the tracks were removed within a few years of the closure.  Heritage trolley cars of the Yakima Interurban Lines Association carried tourists on the YVT tracks between Wiley City and Yakima from 1974 to 1985, mainly on summer weekends.

References

External links
 Historical photos of Wiley City
 

Unincorporated communities in Yakima County, Washington
Unincorporated communities in Washington (state)